Siya is a 2022 Indian Hindi language crime and drama film directed by Manish Mundra, produced by Drishyam Films.

Plot 
The film is about a small town girl, Siya who fought for justice against all odds and start protest against the vicious system.

Critical reception 
Shubhra Gupta, film critic of The Indian Express rated 2 out of 5 ratings, Nishtha Gautam of The Quint verdict the film 4 out of 5, Dhaval Roy of The Times of India rated 3.5 out of 6, Shilajit Mitra of The New Indian Express rated 2.5 out of 5 ratings and Prateek Sur of Outlook India rated 3.5 out of 5 ratings.

Subhash K. Jha, film critic of Firstpost wrote "Siya is not a film without virtues. But it’s a film without hope. And that defeats the very purpose of cinema.", Udita Jhunjhunwala of News9Live wrote "Manish Mundra’s directorial debut is well-intentioned but unsettled", Dishya Sharma of News18 India wrote the film as "Hard-Hitting Film About Rape Victim", Tanul Thakur of The Indian Wire wrote "An impressive film scoops out meanings from the real-life story itself.", Nairita Mukherjee of India Today wrote "Pooja Pandey, Vineet Singh's film is brutal and honest",. 

The film has been also reviewed by Mayank Shekhar, film critic of Mid-Day, Avinash Singh of Live Hindustan, Saibal Chatterjee of NDTV, Nandini Ramnath of Scroll.in and Anuj Kumar of The Hindu.

References 

2022 films